K-Dur (Merck)
K-Lease
K-Tab
K+ redirects to potassium
Kadian (Actavis)
Kafocin
Kainair
kainic acid (INN)
kalafungin (INN)
Kaletra (Abbott Laboratories)
kallidinogenase (INN)
kanamycin (INN)
Kantrex (Bristol-Myers Squibb)
Kaon Cl
Kappadione (Eli Lilly and Company)
Kapidex
Kariva
Kayexalate (Sanofi Aventis)
kebuzone (INN)
Keflet
Keflex (Eli Lilly and Company)
Keflin
Keftab
Kefurox
Kefzol
keliximab (INN)
Kemadrin (Monarch Pharmaceuticals)
Kemstro (Schwarz Pharma)
Kenacort (Aspen Pharma)
Kenalog (Bristol-Myers Squibb)
Keppra (UCB)
keracyanin (INN)
Kerledex (Sanofi Aventis)
Kerlone
Kesso-Gesic
Ketalar (JHP Pharmaceuticals)
ketamine (INN)
ketanserin (INN)
ketazocine (INN)
ketazolam (INN)
Ketek  (Sanofi-Aventis) redirects to telithromycin
ketimipramine (INN)
ketobemidone (INN)
ketocaine (INN)
ketocainol (INN)
ketoconazole (INN)
ketoprofen (INN)
ketorfanol (INN)
ketorolac (INN)
ketotifen (INN)
ketotrexate (INN)
ketoxal (INN)
Ketozole
khellin (INN)
khelloside (INN)
Kinevac
Kionex
kitasamycin (INN)
Klaron
Klebcil
Klonopin redirects to Clonazepam
Klor-con
Kloromin
Klotrix
Koglucoid
Konakion
Konazol (Hexal Australia) [Au]. Redirects to ketoconazole.
Korostatin
Kwell redirects to Lindane
Kytril